Thruxton Aerodrome  is located in Thruxton,  west of Andover, in Hampshire, England.

The airfield was opened in 1942 as RAF Thruxton. Postwar, it was reopened by the Wiltshire School of Flying in 1947, and private and club flying operations continue to the present time.

Thruxton Aerodrome has a CAA Ordinary Licence (Number P544) that allows flights for the public transport of passengers or for flying instruction as authorised by the licensee, Western Air (Thruxton) Limited.

Motorbike racing began on a track using the runways and perimeter roads in 1950. Thruxton Circuit, which follows the line of the perimeter road, has been used for motorbike and car racing since 1968.

Many air cadets were trained here on Flying Scholarships and gained their PPLs. The training was carried out by the Wiltshire School of Flying on DH.82 Tiger Moth and Jackaroo aircraft.

References

External links
 Western Air (Thruxton) Ltd

Airports in Hampshire
Airports established in 1942
1942 establishments in England